The military budget is the largest portion of the discretionary United States federal budget allocated to the Department of Defense, or more broadly, the portion of the budget that goes to any military-related expenditures. The military budget pays the salaries, training, and health care of uniformed and civilian personnel, maintains arms, equipment and facilities, funds operations, and develops and buys new items. The budget funds five branches of the U.S. military: the Army, Navy, Marine Corps, Air Force, and Space Force.

Budget for FY2024

As of 10 March 2023 the FY2023 presidential budget request was $842 billion. 
In January 2023 Treasury Secretary Janet Yellen announced the US government would hit its $31.4 trillion debt ceiling on 19 January 2023; the 'X date' on which the US government would no longer be able to use 'extraordinary measures' such as issuance of Treasury securities is estimated to be in June 2023.

Budget for FY2023

As of 2 March 2022, the defense department was still operating under a continuing resolution, which constrains spending even though DoD has to respond to world events, such as the 2022 Russian invasion of Ukraine; the FY2023 defense budget request will exceed $773 billion, according to the chairman of the House Armed Services Committee. By 9 March 2022
a bipartisan agreement on a $782 billion defense budget had been reached (as part of an overall $1.5 trillion budget for FY2022 —thus avoiding a government shutdown).

As of 4 April 2022 the FY2023 presidential budget request of $773 billion included $177.5 billion for the Army, $194 billion for the Air Force and Space Force, and  $230.8 billion for the Navy and Marine Corps (up 4.1% from FY2022 request). As of 12 December 2022 the House and Senate versions of the Fiscal Year 2023 National Defense Authorization bill (FY2023 NDAA) were to be $839 billion, and $847 billion, for the HASC, and SASC respectively, for a compromise $857.9 billion topline.  By 16 December 2022 the current budget extension resolution will have expired. The President signed the FY2023 Appropriations bill on 23 December 2022.

The United States' military spending in 2021 reached $801bn a year according to the Stockholm International Peace Research Institute.

Budget for FY2022
In May 2021, the President's defense budget request for fiscal year 2022 (FY2022) was $715 billion, up $10 billion, from FY2021's $705 billion. The total FY2022 defense budget request, including the Department of Energy, was $753 billion, up $12 billion from FY2021's budget request.  On 22 July 2021 the Senate Armed Services Committee approved a budget $25 billion greater than the President's defense budget request for FY2022. The National Defense Authorization Act, budgeting $740 billion for defense, was signed 27 December 2021.

By military department, the Army's portion of the budget request, $173 billion, dropped $3.6 billion from the enacted FY2021 budget; the Department of the Navy's portion of the budget request, $211.7 billion, rose 1.8% from the enacted FY2021 budget, largely due to the 6% increase for the Marine Corps' restructuring to a littoral combat force (Navy request: $163.9 billion, or just 0.6% over FY2021, Marine Corps request: $47.9 billion, a 6.2% increase over FY2021); the Air Force's $156.3 billion request for FY2022 is a 2.3% increase over FY21 enacted budget; the Space Force budget of $17.4 billion is a 13.1% increase over FY21 enacted budget. 
Overseas Contingency Operations (OCO) is now replaced by 'direct war and enduring costs', which are now migrated into the budget. After the release of the FY2022 budget requests to Congress, the military departments also posted their Unfunded priorities/requirements lists for the Congressional Armed Services Committees.

Budget for FY2021 
For Fiscal Year 2021 (FY2021), the Department of Defense's discretionary budget authority is approximately $705.39 billion ($705,390,000,000). Mandatory spending of $10.77 billion, the Department of Energy and defense-related spending of $37.335 billion added up to the total FY2021 Defense budget of $753.5 billion. FY2021 was the last year for Overseas Contingency Operations (OCO) as shown by the troop withdrawal from Afghanistan. Research, Development, Test, and Evaluation (RDT&E) investments for the future are offset by the OCO cuts, and by reduced procurement of legacy materiel.

Budget Summary for FY 2021 with Projections for FY 2022-2025 

(Expenditures listed in million $)

Budget for FY2020 

For Fiscal Year 2020 (FY2020), the Department of Defense's budget authority is approximately $721.5 billion ($721,531,000,000). Approximately $712.6 billion is discretionary spending with approximately $8.9 billion in mandatory spending. The Department of Defense estimates that $689.6 billion ($689,585,000,000) will actually be spent (outlays). Both left-wing and right-wing commentators have advocated for the cutting of military spending.

Budget for FY2019 
For FY2019, the Department of Defense's budget authority was $693,058,000,000 (Including Discretionary and Mandatory Budget Authority).

Total overview

For personnel payment and benefits 
Personnel payment and benefits take up approximately 39.14% of the total budget of $686,074,048,000

By Overseas Contingency Operation 
Overseas Contingency Operations (OCO) funds are sometimes called War funds

By Military Department

Military Health Care Funding 

The MHS offers, but does not always provide, a health care benefit to 9.5 million eligible beneficiaries, which includes active military members and their families, military retirees and their families, dependent survivors, and certain eligible Reserve Component members and their families. The Unified Medical Budget (UMB), which comprise the funding and personnel needed to support the MHS’ mission, consumes nearly 9% of the Department’s topline budget authority. Thus, it is a significant line item in the Department’s financial portfolio.

Budgeting Terms 
Budget Authority: the authority to legally incur binding obligations (like signing contracts and placing orders), that will result in current and future outlays. When "military budget" is mentioned, people generally are referring to discretionary budget authority.

Outlays: Also known as expenditures or disbursements, it is the liquidation of obligations and general represent cash payments.

Total Obligational Authority: DoD financial term expressing the value of the direct Defense program for a given fiscal year, exclusive of the obligation authority from other sources (such as reimbursable orders accepted)

Discretionary: Annually appropriated by the United States Congress, subject to budget caps.

Mandatory: Budget Authority authorized by permanent law.

Previous budgets 
As of 2013, the Department of Defense was the third largest executive branch department and utilized 20% of the federal budget.

For the 2011 fiscal year, the president's base budget for the Department of Defense and spending on "overseas contingency operations" combine to bring the sum to US$664.84 billion.

When the budget was signed into law on 28 October 2009, the final size of the Department of Defense's budget was $680 billion, $16 billion more than President Obama had requested. An additional $37 billion supplemental bill to support the wars in Iraq and Afghanistan was expected to pass in the spring of 2010, but has been delayed by the House of Representatives after passing the Senate.

Emergency and supplemental spending 
The recent military operations in Iraq and Afghanistan were largely funded through supplementary spending bills that supplemented the annual military budget requests for each fiscal year. However, the wars in Iraq and Afghanistan were categorized as "overseas contingency operations" in the starting of the fiscal year 2010, and the budget is included in the federal budget.

By the end of 2008, the U.S. had spent approximately $900 billion in direct costs on the wars in Iraq and Afghanistan. The government also incurred indirect costs, which include interests on additional debt and incremental costs, financed by the Veterans Administration, of caring for more than 33,000 wounded. Some experts estimate the indirect costs will eventually exceed the direct costs. As of June 2011, the total cost of the wars was approximately $1.3 trillion.

By title 

The federally budgeted (see below) military expenditure of the United States Department of Defense for fiscal year 2013 are as follows. While data is provided from the 2015 budget, data for 2014 and 2015 is estimated, and thus data is shown for the last year for which definite data exists (2013).

By entity

Programs spending more than $1.5 billion 
The Department of Defense's FY 2011 $137.5 billion procurement and $77.2 billion RDT&E budget requests included several programs worth more than $1.5 billion.

Other military-related expenditures 
This does not include many military-related items that are outside of the Defense Department budget, such as nuclear weapons research, maintenance, cleanup, and production, which are in the Atomic Energy Defense Activities section, Veterans Affairs, the Treasury Department's payments in pensions to military retirees and widows and their families, interest on debt incurred in past wars, or State Department financing of foreign arms sales and militarily-related development assistance. Neither does it include defense spending that is domestic rather than international in nature, such as the Department of Homeland Security, counter-terrorism spending by the Federal Bureau of Investigation, and intelligence-gathering spending by NSA, although these programs contain certain weapons, military and security components.

Audit of 2011 budget 
Again in 2011, the GAO could not "render an opinion on the 2011 consolidated financial statements of the federal government", with a major obstacle again being "serious financial management problems at the Department of Defense (DOD) that made its financial statements unauditable".

In December 2011, the GAO found that "neither the Navy nor the Marine Corps have implemented effective processes for reconciling their FBWT." According to the GAO, "An agency's FBWT account is similar in concept to a corporate bank account. The difference is that instead of a cash balance, FBWT represents unexpended spending authority in appropriations." In addition, "As of April 2011, there were more than $22 billion unmatched disbursements and collections affecting more than 10,000 lines of accounting."

Audit of implementation of budget for 2010 
The US Government Accountability Office (GAO) was unable to provide an audit opinion on the 2010 financial statements of the US Government because of 'widespread material internal control weaknesses, significant uncertainties, and other limitations'. The GAO cited as the principal obstacle to its provision of an audit opinion 'serious financial management problems at the Department of Defense that made its financial statements unauditable'.

In FY 2010, six out of thirty-three DoD reporting entities received unqualified audit opinions.

Chief financial officer and Under Secretary of Defense Robert F. Hale acknowledged enterprise-wide problems with systems and processes, while the DoD's Inspector General reported 'material internal control weaknesses ... that affect the safeguarding of assets, proper use of funds, and impair the prevention and identification of fraud, waste, and abuse'. Further management discussion in the FY 2010 DoD Financial Report states 'it is not feasible to deploy a vast number of accountants to manually reconcile our books' and concludes that 'although the financial statements are not auditable for FY 2010, the Department's financial managers are meeting warfighter needs'.

Budget for 2016 
On 9 February 2016, the US Department of Defense under President Obama released a statement outlining the proposed 2016 and 2017 defense spending budgets that "[reflect] the priorities necessary for our force today and in the future to best serve and protect our nation in a rapidly changing security environment."

Budget request for FY2019
In February 2018, the Pentagon requested $686 billion for FY 2019.

The John S. McCain National Defense Authorization Act authorized Department of Defense appropriations for 2019 and established policies, but it did not contain the budget itself. On 26 July, this bill passed in the House of Representatives by 359-54. On 1 August, the US Senate passed it by 87-10. The bill was presented to President Trump two days later. He signed it on 13 August.

On 28 September 2018, Trump signed the Department of Defense appropriations bill. The approved 2019 Department of Defense discretionary budget was $686.1 billion. It has also been described as "$617 billion for the base budget and another $69 billion for war funding."

Budget request for FY2018
On 16 March 2017 President Trump submitted his request to Congress for $639 billion in military spending (an increase of $54 billion, 10% for FY 2018, as well as $30 billion for FY2017, which ends in September). With a total federal budget of $3.9 trillion for FY2018, the increase in military spending would result in deep cuts to many other federal agencies and domestic programs, as well as the State Department. Trump had pledged to "rebuild" the military as part of his 2016 Presidential campaign.

In April 2017, journalist Scot J. Paltrow raised concerns about the increase in spending with the Pentagon's history of "faulty accounting".

On 14 July, H.R. 2810 the National Defense Authorization Act 2018 was passed by the U.S. House of Representatives 344 - 81, with 8 not voting. 60% of Democrats voted for this bill, which represented an 18% increase in defense spending. The Congress increased the budget to total 696 billion dollars.

Budget request for FY2017 

The currently available budget request for 2017 was filed on 9 February 2016, under then-President Barack Obama.

The press release of the proposal specifies the structure and goals for the Fiscal Year (FY) 2017 budget:

The FY 2017 budget reflects recent strategic threats and changes that have taken place in Asia, the Middle East and Europe. Russian aggression, terrorism by the Islamic State of Iraq and the Levant (ISIL) and others, and China's island building and claims of sovereignty in international waters all necessitate changes in our strategic outlook and in our operational commitments. Threats and actions originating in Iran and North Korea negatively affect our interests and our allies. These challenges have sharpened the focus of our planning and budgeting.

The proposal also includes a comparison of the 2016 and the proposed 2017 request amounts, a summary of acquisitions requested for 2017 and enacted in 2016, and provides in detail a breakdown of specific programs to be funded.

Investments 

Amounts are in $ billions.

Major acquisition programs 
These are the top 25 DoD weapon programs described in detail:

$ in billions, Qty being the number of items requested.

Science and Technology Program 
This program's purpose is to "invest in and develop capabilities that advance the technical superiority of the U.S. Military to counter new and emerging threats." It has a budget of $12.5 billion, but is apart from the overall Research, Development, Test, and Evaluation (RDT&E) portfolio, which comprises $71.8 billion. Efforts funded apply to the Obama administration's refocusing of the US military to Asia, identifying investments to "sustain and advance [the] DoD's military dominance for the 21st century", counter the "technological advances of U.S. foes", and support Manufacturing Initiative institutes. A breakdown of the amounts provided, by tier of research, is provided:

Total budget by department 

Amounts in thousands of $US

Total budget of military 

*Research, Development, Test and Evaluation

Amounts in thousands of $US

Funding of payments and benefits 
This portion of the military budget comprises roughly one third to one half of the total defense budget, considering only military personnel or additionally including civilian personnel, respectively. These expenditures will typically be, the single largest expense category for the Department. Since 2001, military pay and benefits have increased by 85%, but remained roughly one third of the total budget due to an overall increased budget. Military pay remains at about the 70th percentile compared to the private sector to attract sufficient amounts of qualified personnel.

Funding the military health system 
The request for 2017 amounts to $48.8 billion. The system has 9.4 million beneficiaries, including active, retired, and eligible Reserve Component military personnel and their families, and dependent survivors.

Budget by year 

The accompanying graphs show that U.S. military spending as a percent of GDP peaked during World War II.

The table shows historical spending on defense from 1996–2015, spending for 2014–15 is estimated. The defense budget is shown in billions of dollars and total budget in trillions of dollars. The percentage of the total U.S. federal budget spent on defense is indicated in the third row, and change in defense spending from the previous year in the final row.

Support service contractors 

The role of support service contractors has increased since 2001 and in 2007 payments for contractor services exceeded investments in equipment for the armed forces for the first time. In the 2010 budget, the support service contractors will be reduced from the current 39 percent of the workforce down to the pre-2001 level of 26 percent. In a Pentagon review of January 2011, service contractors were found to be "increasingly unaffordable."

Military budget and total US federal spending 

The U.S. Department of Defense budget accounted in fiscal year 2017 for about 14.8% of the United States federal budgeted expenditures. According to the Congressional Budget Office, defense spending grew 9% annually on average in fiscal years 2000–2009.

Because of constitutional limitations, military funding is appropriated in a discretionary spending account. (Such accounts permit government planners to have more flexibility to change spending each year, as opposed to mandatory spending accounts that mandate spending on programs in accordance with the law, outside of the budgetary process.) In recent years, discretionary spending as a whole has amounted to about one-third of total federal outlays. Department of Defense spending's share of discretionary spending was 50.5% in 2003, and has risen to between 53% and 54% in recent years.

For FY 2017, Department of Defense spending amounts to 3.42% of GDP. Because the U.S. GDP has grown over time, the military budget can rise in absolute terms while shrinking as a percentage of the GDP. For example, the Department of Defense budget was slated to be $664 billion in 2010 (including the cost of operations in Iraq and Afghanistan previously funded through supplementary budget legislation), higher than at any other point in American history, but still 1.1–1.4% lower as a percentage of GDP than the amount spent on military during the peak of Cold-War military spending in the late 1980s. Admiral Mike Mullen, former Chairman of the Joint Chiefs of Staff, has called four percent an "absolute floor". This calculation does not take into account some other military-related non-DOD spending, such as Veterans Affairs, Homeland Security, and interest paid on debt incurred in past wars, which has increased even as a percentage of the national GDP.

In 2015, Pentagon and related spending totaled $598 billion.

In addition, the United States will spend at least $179 billion over the fiscal years of 2010-2018 on its nuclear arsenal, averaging $20 billion per year. Despite President Barack Obama's attempts in the media to reduce the scope of the current nuclear arms race, the U.S. intends to spend an additional $1 trillion over the next 30 years modernizing its nuclear arsenal.

In September 2017 the United States Senate followed President Donald Trump's plan to expand military spending, which will boost spending to $700 billion, about 91.4% of which will be spent on maintaining the armed forces and primary Pentagon costs. Military spending is increasing regularly and more money is being spent every year on employee pay, operation and maintenance, and benefits including health benefits. Methods to counteract rapidly increasing spending include shutting down bases, but that was banned by the Bipartisan Budget Act of 2013.

Federal waste 
As of September 2014, the Department of Defense was estimated to have "$857 million in excess parts and supplies". This figure has risen over the past years, and of the Pentagon waste that has been calculated, two figures are especially worth mentioning: the expenditure of "$150 million on private villas for a handful of Pentagon employees in Afghanistan and the procurement of the JLENS air-defense balloon" which, throughout the program's development over the past two decades, is estimated to have cost $2.7 billion.

Comparison with other countries 

The United States spends more on national defense than China, India, Russia, Saudi Arabia, France, Germany, United Kingdom, Japan, South Korea, and Brazil combined. The 2018 U.S. military budget accounts for approximately 36% of global arms spending (for comparison, U.S. GDP is only 24% of global GDP). The 2018 budget is approximately 2.5 times larger than the $250 billion military budget of China. The United States and its close allies are responsible for two-thirds to three-quarters of the world's military spending (of which, in turn, the U.S. is responsible for the majority). The US also maintains the largest number of military bases on foreign soil across the world. While there are no freestanding foreign bases permanently located in the United States, there are now around 800 U.S. bases in foreign countries. Military spending makes up nearly 16% of entire federal spending and approximately half of discretionary spending. In a general sense discretionary spending (defense and non-defense spending) makes up one-third of the annual federal budget.

In 2015, out of its budget of 3.97 trillion, the United States spent $637 billion on military.

In 2016, the United States spent 3.29% of its GDP on its military (considering only basic Department of Defense budget spending), more than France's 2.26% and less than Saudi Arabia's 9.85%. This is historically low for the United States since it peaked in 1944 at 37.8% of GDP (it reached the lowest point of 3.0% in 1999–2001). Even during the peak of the Vietnam War the percentage reached a high of 9.4% in 1968.

In 2018, the United States spent 3.2% of its GDP on its military, while Saudi Arabia spent 8.8%, Israel spent 4.3%, Pakistan spent 4.0%, Russia spent 3.9%, South Korea spent 2.6%, China spent 1.9%, United Kingdom spent 1.8%, and Germany spent 1.2% of its GDP on defense.

The US Military's budget has plateaued in 2009, but is still considerably larger than any other military power.

Past commentary on military budget 
In 2009, Secretary of Defense Robert Gates wrote that the U.S. should adjust its priorities and spending to address the changing nature of threats in the world: "What all these potential adversaries—from terrorist cells to rogue nations to rising powers—have in common is that they have learned that it is unwise to confront the United States directly on conventional military terms. The United States cannot take its current dominance for granted and needs to invest in the programs, platforms, and personnel that will ensure that dominance's persistence. But it is also important to keep some perspective. As much as the U.S. Navy has shrunk since the end of the Cold War, for example, in terms of tonnage, its battle fleet is still larger than the next 13 navies combined—and 11 of those 13 navies are U.S. allies or partners." Secretary Gates announced some of his budget recommendations in April 2009.

According to a 2009 Congressional Research Service there was a discrepancy between a budget that is declining as a percentage of GDP while the responsibilities of the DoD have not decreased and additional pressures on the military budget have arisen due to broader missions in the post-9/11 world, dramatic increases in personnel and operating costs, and new requirements resulting from wartime lessons in the Iraq War and Operation Enduring Freedom.

Expenses for fiscal years 2001 through 2010 were analyzed by Russell Rumbaugh, a retired Army officer and ex-CIA military analyst, in a report for the Stimson Center. Rumbaugh wrote: "Between 1981 and 1990, the Air Force bought 2,063 fighters. In contrast, between 2001 and 2010, it bought only 220. Yet between 2001 and 2010 the Air Force spent $38B of procurement funding just on fighter aircraft in inflation-adjusted dollars, compared with the $68B it spent between 1981 and 1990. In other words, the Air Force spent 55 percent as much money to get 10 percent as many fighters." As Adam Weinstein explained one of the report's findings: "Of the roughly $1 trillion spent on gadgetry since 9/11, 22 percent of it came from 'supplemental' war funding — annual outlays that are voted on separately from the regular defense budget."

Most of the $5 billion in budget "cuts" for 2013 that were mandated by Congress in 2012 really only shifted expenses from the general military budget to the Afghanistan war budget. Declaring that nearly 65,000 troops were temporary rather than part of the permanent forces resulted in the reallocation of $4 billion in existing expenses to this different budget.

In May 2012, as part of Obama's East Asia "pivot", his 2013 national military request moved funding from the Army and Marines to favor the Navy, but the Congress has resisted this.

Reports emerged in February 2014 that Secretary of Defense Chuck Hagel was planning to trim the defense budget by billions of dollars. The secretary in his first defense budget planned to limit pay rises, increase fees for healthcare benefits, freeze the pay of senior officers, reduce military housing allowances, and reduce the size of the force.

In July 2014, American Enterprise Institute scholar Michael Auslin opined in the National Review that the Air Force needs to be fully funded as a priority, due to the air superiority, global airlift, and long-range strike capabilities it provides.

In January 2015 Defense Department published its internal study on how to save $125 billion on its military budget  from 2016 to 2020 by renegotiating vendor contracts and pushing for stronger deals, and by offering workers early retirement and retraining.

2012 fiscal cliff 
On 5 December 2012, the Department of Defense announced it was planning for automatic spending cuts, which include $500 billion and an additional $487 billion due to the 2011 Budget Control Act, due to the fiscal cliff. According to Politico, the Department of Defense declined to explain to the House of Representatives Appropriations Committee, which controls federal spending, what its plans were regarding the fiscal cliff planning.

This was after half a dozen Congresspeople very experienced in military matters either resigned from Congress or lost their reelection fights, including Joe Lieberman (I-CT).

Lawrence Korb has noted that given recent trends military entitlements and personnel costs will take up the entire defense budget by 2039.

GAO audits 
The Government Accountability Office was unable to provide an audit opinion on the 2010 financial statements of the U.S. government due to "widespread material internal control weaknesses, significant uncertainties, and other limitations." The GAO cited as the principal obstacle to its provision of an audit opinion "serious financial management problems at the Department of Defense that made its financial statements unauditable."

In Fiscal Year (FY) 2011, seven out of 33 DoD reporting entities received unqualified audit opinions. Under Secretary of Defense Robert F. Hale acknowledged enterprise-wide weaknesses with controls and systems. Further management discussion in the FY 2011 DoD Financial Report states "we are not able to deploy the vast numbers of accountants that would be required to reconcile our books manually". Congress has established a deadline of FY 2017 for the DoD to achieve audit readiness.

For FYs 1998-2010 the Department of Defense's financial statements were either unauditable or such that no audit opinion could be expressed.  Several years behind other government agencies, the first results from an army of about 2,400 contracted DoD auditors are expected on 15 November 2018.

Post–World War II overview and reform

Post–World War II

The conclusion of World War II and the start of the Cold War prompted the rapid expansion of a arms race. Subsequently, the reallocation of budgets, prompted by several wars and proxy wars forced the Department of Defense to increase research and development of new military systems and equipment to proliferate on a mass scale to compete with, at the time, the Soviet Union. On January 17, 1961, then President Dwight D. Eisenhower in a farewell address to the United States warned the people and government of the United States about the creation of a “military-industrial complex”. As prompted by President Eisenhower, the war had arguably become an industry. It was also speculated (by Eisenhower) that the arms industry would bring war-like industrial influence into the various sectors of government. In a section of President Eisenhower’s speech, he stated: “In the councils of government, we must guard against the acquisition of unwarranted influence, whether sought or unsought, by the military-industrial complex. The potential for the disastrous rise of misplaced power exists and will persist”. 

Following the departure of President Eisenhower, the expenditures and budgets of the United States military grew exponentially. The Cold War (1947-1991) developed the largest proliferation of a nuclear arsenal to date. New defense contractors stood up to supply the demand for the military and its various conflicts across the globe. In addition, the war in Indochina was the largest expenditure during the Cold War at approximately $168 billion or about $1 trillion in today’s inflated costs. 

In a statement of 6 January 2011, Defense Secretary Robert M. Gates stated: "This department simply cannot risk continuing down the same path – where our investment priorities, bureaucratic habits and lax attitude towards costs are increasingly divorced from the real threats of today, the growing perils of tomorrow and the nation's grim financial outlook." Gates has proposed a budget that, if approved by Congress, would reduce the costs of many DOD programs and policies, including reports, the IT infrastructure, fuel, weapon programs, DOD bureaucracies, and personnel.

The 2015 expenditure for Army research, development and acquisition changed from $32 billion projected in 2012 for FY15, to $21 billion for FY15 expected in 2014.

In 2018, it was announced that the Department of Defense was indeed the subject of a comprehensive budgetary audit. This review was conducted by private, third-party accounting consultants. The audit ended and was deemed incomplete due to deficient accounting practices in the department.

In 2022, the United States had the largest defense budget and expenditures of any other country in the world totaling around 777.1 billion dollars (FY22). The rise in the military budget over the last decade can be traced to the production of new technologies such as 5th generation fighter aircraft to meet the increase of demand for new combat capabilities. Also to note, much of these costs were the result of “R&D”, or research and development. Research and Development is one of the United States’ primary focuses in the defense budget . 

Opponents of growing military spending budgets have long argued that the United States should refocus and reallocate the military budgets to promote social welfare. However, the projections for the near future are that the defense budget and its expenditures are only going to continue to grow exponentially. In the published FY22 budget report, the authority has been given to increase the defense budget by about 17 billion dollars ($535 billion of which is a part of contract obligations) from FY21. In addition, the Biden Administration has proposed another increase of the FY23 budget to $737 billion. On the contrary, proponents of increasing the U.S. Defense budgets have long argued that factors such as China and other adversaries of the U.S. must be kept in check (from a military standpoint).

References

Further reading

External links
US Government Defense Spending History with Charts - a www.usgovernmentspending.com briefing (archived)

United States Department of Defense
United States federal budgets
United States